Theudas was allegedly the name of a Christian Gnostic thinker, who was a follower of Paul the Apostle. He went on to teach the Gnostic Valentinus. The only evidence of this connection is the testimony of Valentinius' followers and Clement of Alexandria.

It has been proposed that he was the Theudas mentioned in the Bible, but it is unlikely, as the latter would have been dead before Valentinus's birth.

References

Gnostics